Gilberto Cirilo de Campos (July 6, 1964 in São Borja – July 23, 2018 in Santa Cruz do Sul), commonly known as Beto Campos, was a Brazilian football manager.

Managerial statistics

Honours 
Avenida 
Campeonato Gaúcho Série B:2011

Caxias
 Campeonato Gaúcho Série B: 2016

Novo Hamburgo 
 Campeonato Gaúcho: 2017

Individual
Campeonato Gaúcho Coach of the Year: 2017

References

1964 births
Living people
People from São Borja
Brazilian football managers
Campeonato Brasileiro Série B managers
Campeonato Brasileiro Série C managers
Esporte Clube Pelotas managers
Esporte Clube Avenida managers
Sport Club São Paulo managers
Esporte Clube Cruzeiro managers
Associação Esportiva e Recreativa Santo Ângelo managers
Esporte Clube Passo Fundo managers
Esporte Clube São José managers
Sociedade Esportiva e Recreativa Caxias do Sul managers
Esporte Clube Novo Hamburgo managers
Clube Náutico Capibaribe managers
Criciúma Esporte Clube managers
Sportspeople from Rio Grande do Sul